"One Man's Junk" (also known as "Antique No Show") is an episode of the BBC Sit-com, The Green Green Grass. It was screened on 26 February 2009, as the eighth episode of the fourth series.

Synopsis
The Antiques Roadshow arrives in Oakham, so Marlene attempts to find something to take down to have valued. Boycie can see the truth though, he knows that she only wants to go down there to get on telly. The farms staff also want to get on telly, but their attempts are slightly more extraordinary. Meanwhile, Tyler and his girlfriend make progress and the rest of Oakham attempt to find something to take down and have valued. Guest starring Fiona Bruce.

Episode cast

Production, broadcast and reception

Broadcast
This episode was first broadcast on Thursday 26 February 2009 at approximately 20:30PM (UTC).

Writer and cast
This episode of The Green Green Grass sees the second appearance of Fiona Bruce. She first appeared in the episode "One Flew Over the Cuckoo Clock" in 2005 where she was a presenter on Watchdog.
This is the only of the series to be written by Robert Evans.

Continuity
Fiona Bruce makes her second appearance.
Marlene has made comments about the Antiques Roadshow in previous episodes of both The Green Green Grass and Only Fools and Horses. Coincidentally, she mentions The Royle Family, a famous scene from which involved Antiques Roadshow.

References

External links
British TV Comedy Guide for The Green Green Grass
BARB viewing figures

2009 British television episodes
The Green Green Grass episodes